Lovette Lee Hill (March 23, 1907 – August 27, 1989) was an American football and baseball coach.  He was the fourth head coach of the Houston Cougars baseball team from 1950 to 1974.  Hill holds the record for the longest serving head baseball coach in University of Houston history.  While at Houston, Hill compiled a 343–325–5 record with five first-place finishes in the Missouri Valley Conference.  He guided the Cougars to their only two College World Series appearances, in 1953 and 1967.  In 1967, his team was national runner-up.

From 1949 to 1961, Hill also served as an assistant coach for the Houston Cougars football team.  He graduated in 1931 from Centenary College of Louisiana.

Head coaching record

References

External links
 

1907 births
1989 deaths
American football ends
Centenary Gentlemen baseball players
Centenary Gentlemen football players
Houston Cougars baseball coaches
Houston Cougars football coaches
People from Williamson County, Texas